The 2020 Western Michigan Broncos football team represented Western Michigan University in the 2020 NCAA Division I FBS football season. The Broncos played their home games at Waldo Stadium in Kalamazoo, Michigan, and competed in the West Division of the Mid-American Conference (MAC). The team was led by fourth-year head coach Tim Lester. On August 8, 2020, it was announced that the MAC would be cancelling the season due to the COVID-19 pandemic. The MAC later changed that decision, with teams playing a six-game conference-only season.

Schedule
Western Michigan had games scheduled against Stony Brook and Syracuse, which were canceled due to the COVID-19 pandemic.

Players drafted into the NFL

References

Western Michigan
Western Michigan Broncos football seasons
Western Michigan Broncos football